{{DISPLAYTITLE:C3H6Br2}}
The molecular formula C3H6Br2 (molar mass: 201.889 g/mol, exact mass: 199.8836 u) may refer to:

 1,2-Dibromopropane, also known as propylene dibromide
 1,3-Dibromopropane